Longtian may refer to:

Towns
Longtian, Fujian, in Fuqing, Fujian, China
Longtian, Longmen County, in Longmen County, Guangdong, China
Longtian, Xingning, in Xingning, Guangdong, China
Longtian, Guizhou, in Cengong County, Guizhou, China
Longtian, Ningxiang County, in Ningxiang County, Hunan, China

Townships
Longtian Township, Anhui, in Xiuning County, Anhui, China
Longtian Township, Chongqing, in Chengkou County, Chongqing, China
Longtian Township, Hongjiang, in Hongjiang, Hunan, China
Longtian Township, Wugang, in Wugang, Hunan, China
Longtian Township, Jiangxi, in Yongxin County, Jiangxi, China